Poznań Studies in Contemporary Linguistics is a peer-reviewed academic journal of general linguistics that was established in 2011 and is published by De Gruyter. Its editor-in-chief is Katarzyna Dziubalska-Kolaczyk (Adam Mickiewicz University).

References

External links

Linguistics journals
Publications established in 2011
English-language journals
Hybrid open access journals
De Gruyter academic journals